Bhagavan Bridge refers to a bridge found in the Girivalam path at Tiruvannamalai, in the Indian state of Tamil Nadu where Bhagavan Sri Ramana Maharshi used to take rest, when He used to go for Giri-pradakshina around the Arunachala Hill.

References
1. http://wikimapia.org/10049458/Bhagavan-Bridge

Bridges in Tamil Nadu